Kloof  is a leafy upper-class town, that includes a smaller area called Everton, located approximately  26 km north-west of Durban in KwaZulu-Natal, South Africa. Once an independent municipality, it now forms part of greater Durban area of the eThekwini Metropolitan Municipality.

The word Kloof (cf. cleft) means 'gorge' in Afrikaans and the area is named after the deep ravine formed by the Molweni stream (stream of high cliffs). The Kloof Gorge is part of the  Krantzkloof Nature Reserve.

It is a predominantly English-speaking area. Kloof features several upmarket shopping centres and the Kloof Country Club, founded in 1927. It is known as a mist-belt with winding roads and tree-surrounded mansions.

History
Details of the history of Kloof has been written by

Richmond Farm
This part of KwaZulu-Natal was originally a  farm 'Richmond', whose survey was ordained by the first Lieutenant-Governor of Colony Sir Martin West, following his 1845 appointment to the post; he also named it, after Charles Lennox, 4th Duke of Richmond (Yorkshire, England).

The land Kloof occupies formed the  Richmond Farm No. 999:  this was purchased by William Swan FIELD, the first Collector of Customs (position he held until 1852) for Natal Colony, in 1845 for an amount of £245. He was also one of the first Magistrates of Durban. In 1845 his brother John Coote FIELD and his family settled on the farm, having arrived from the Cape Colony on the Pilot. The farm was eventually transferred into J C Field's name by Deed of Transfer in 1867, at a declared value of £1,401 pounds & 10 shillings.

The original farmhouse, called Richmond House, was built by J C Field in 1854 to replace an earlier wattle & daub house. The 'Richmond' section of the farm passed to his son John Coote FIELD the Second in 1880 on the occasion of his marriage, who partially demolished the original Richmond House and rebuilt another homestead nearby. J C Field the First died in 1896, and upon the death of his widow in 1901 the Farm was divided amongst the surviving heirs:   for each son,  for each daughter, and the homestead plus  to his youngest son Benjamin Cromwell Colenso FIELD. Current surviving relatives of J C Field still reside in the highway area: John Padley Field (adopted) and his daughter Kathleen Merle Field.

Kloof village
The further subdivisions and sale of portions of Richmond Farm No. 999 by the Field heirs after 1901 resulted in the birth of Kloof as a residential area:  numerous plots were sold to wealthy Durban residents and businessmen, who built country house retreats close to the city, but (due to its 550 m above sea level elevation) removed from the Durban humidity and heat. These were particularly favoured by their wives and children during the long hot summer holidays.

From the 1890s onwards the appearance of the area therefore changed significantly, from its previous 'sandstone sourveld' grassland to its current heavily wooded flora.

Kloof was originally called 'Krantzkloof' by J C Field the First, after the nearby Kloof Gorge, but this name was later changed to 'Kloof' at the special request of the General Manager of the Railways, since due to a name similarity with Kranskop there had been significant confusion and misdeliveries of railway goods:  the Railway Station was therefore renamed, and the town with it.
The current Station building is a replacement of an earlier one, built in 1896, and it remained operational until the closure of this branch of the Durban-Pietermaritzburg railway line to passenger traffic in the 1970s. The building is now being utilised as a popular bar restaurant; it is also the main terminus of the Umgeni Steam Railway.

As roads improved, an increasing number of people began permanently living in Kloof and during the 1960s and 1970s, the development of the traditional Kloof houses occurred. These consisted of large houses that were built on stands of at least . Many of the houses have slate roofs, a swimming pool, small guest houses and tennis courts and they are often tucked away amidst the trees.

Geography 
Kloof is mostly located on the Kloof Plateau which lies just above Pinetown extending from the top of Field's Hill in the east to border with Winston Park, Gillitts, Forest Hills and Hillcrest. Due to the growth of Kloof and the latter neighbouring towns, they have now integrated to become a de facto suburban unit with these suburbs collectively known as the Upper Highway Area which fall under the Outer West region of eThekwini. 

Kloof is bordered by Gillitts and Everton in the west, Molweni in the north, Waterfall in the north-west, Wyebank in the north-east, Pinetown in the east and Winston Park in the south.

Transport
The M13 highway (built in the 1940s) intersects Kloof connecting the town to Pinetown, Westville and Durban to the east and Gillitts, Hillcrest and Pietermaritzburg (via the N3) to the west. As from 16 June this forms part of the route of the annual Comrades Marathon, an approximately  ultra-marathon run between Pietermaritzburg and Durban since 1924.

Schools

Kloof has a state school network that consists of Kloof High School, Forest View Primary School, Kloof Senior Primary School, Kloof Junior Primary School and Kloof Pre-Primary School.

There are also several private schools located in Kloof including Thomas More College and St Mary's Diocesan School for Girls. In the broader area there is also Highbury Preparatory School in Hillcrest and Kearsney College in Botha's Hill.

Wildlife
The many trees that define Kloof provide for an abundance of birds, including the Crowned eagle.

Other wildlife has been preserved in greenbelt areas such as the Krantzkloof Nature Reserve, which includes the Kloof Gorge, and the Everton Conservancy. The Reserve is centered on the main gorge cut by the eMolweni River, and extends in total 532 ha (1,315 ac). It was established by the Natal Parks Board in 1950.

The area around the gorge was once the habitat of leopards and a leopard features prominently on the Kloof crest. (The stuffed leopard in the Durban Museum reportedly was shot in the area). Chacma baboon were once re-introduced to the reserve, but unfortunately, after becoming troublesome, were removed. Bushpig may also be found in the reserve. Both would likely have formed part of the diet of the leopard. Many porcupine are still present in open areas like the local Kloof and Upper Highway SPCA grounds. Genets are often found in forest areas frequent trees looking for prey.

Climate
The rainy season is from the October to March summer months, while winters tend to be very dry.

Botanical gardens
Private botanical gardens which were established by a well-known horticulturalist are now the gardens of a hotel known as the Makaranga Lodge after tall trees planted in the gardens. Visitors are able to arrange guided tours.

The golf course
The Kloof Country Club includes a highly rated 18-hole golf course, which was the only golf course outside of Durban for many years. The M13 highway runs parallel to it.

Places of interest

The Krantzview Nature Reserve is also home to popular rock climbing routes which are used by beginners and experts. It is one of the stomping grounds of sport and traditional rock climbing and if you are more of a spectator, the gorge has easily accessible hiking trails that lead to breath-taking views.

Shopping
Delcairn Centre
Field's Shopping Centre
Maytime Shopping Centre
The Village Mall
Kloof & Upper Highway SPCA (Tea garden, Nursery, Secondhand shops, Animal Shelter, Trail walks)

Activity centres

Kloof Country Club (golf course, tennis and squash courts, cricket oval, and facilities)
Krantzkloof Nature Reserve and Kloof Gorge
Kloof Methodist Church
Kloof Baptist Church
Kloof Tennis Club
St. Agnes Anglican Church, the church building, dating from the 1950s, was built on a piece of land on the farm section 'Glenholm', owned by T. S. P. Field and donated by him to the Anglican Diocese of Natal.
Our Lady of Mercy Catholic Church
Virgin Active gym (formerly Health & Racquet Club)
Kloof Harvest Church
Memorial Park (Also known as the dog park)
West Point Church

Famous residents: past and present
Ladysmith Black Mambazo
Peter Brown, politician
Sir William Firth
Sir Guy Hulett, sugar baron
Marguerite Poland, author
Bobby Skinstad, Springbok rugby player
BJ Botha, Springbok rugby player
Mike Hoare, Irish mercenary
Alan Paton, writer and leader of the Liberal Party of South Africa in the 1960s and 1970s
Simon Lessing, world triathlon champion
Wally Hammond England and Gloucester cricketer died in Kloof 1 July 1965

References

Sources
 
The Highway Mail, 1 June 2011.
The Hilltop, 2 June 2011.
Independent Electoral Commission (South Africa), 9 June 2011.

External links
Kloof Community Website
Kloof Pre-Primary School Website
Kloof Junior Primary School Website
Kloof Senior Primary School Website
Kloof High School Website
Krantzkloof Nature Reserve Website
Kloof Conservancy Website
Official Councillor Website
Rotary Club of Kloof
Our Lady of Mercy Catholic Parish
Kloof & Upper Highway SPCA
Memorial Park

Suburbs of Durban
Populated places established in 1903
Climbing areas of South Africa
1903 establishments in the Colony of Natal
Afrikaans words and phrases